Ljubomir Davidović (24 December 1863 – 19 February 1940) was a Yugoslav and Serbian politician who served as prime minister (1919–1920 and 1924) of the Kingdom of Serbs, Croats, and Slovenes (later called Yugoslavia).

Biography
Davidović was born in a village in the Kosmaj Oblast. He graduated from the science and mathematics department of the College of Arts and Sciences of the Velika škola in Belgrade.

In 1901, he became a member of the Serbian Parliament and played a part in founding the Independent Radical Party, whose leader he eventually became in 1912. He was Minister of Education in 1904; President of the Municipality of Belgrade; and President of the National Assembly in 1909. Between 1914 and 1917, he was minister of education in the cabinet under Nikola Pašić.

The next year, he became the leader of another newly founded party, the Democratic Party. As such, he was prime minister in the coalition of Democrats and Socialists between 1919 and 1920. He briefly was prime minister again in July 1924 in a Coalition of Democrats, Slovene Clericals, and Bosnian Muslims, with support from the Croatian Peasant Party. After 6 January 1929, military-monarchist coup he was one of the leaders of the so-called united opposition. He supported the restoration of parliamentarians in the country.

Precautionary measures
On 12 December 1914, Davidović as Minister of Education and Religious Affairs, issued an order that all items—books, museum exhibits, manuscripts as well as valuable documents from the archives of institutions of culture and science—which were of particular importance and irreplaceable, be packed and dispatched for safekeeping away from the ravages of war. That order was complied by Božidar Prokić, Director of State Archives of the Kingdom of Serbia; Slobodan Jovanović, Rector of the University of Belgrade; Jovan Tomić, Director of the National Library of Serbia; Milan Grol, Director of the Serbian National Theatre; Petar Pavlović, Director of the Natural History Museum of Serbia; Sima Trojanović, Director of the Ethnographic Museum, Belgrade.

Death
Davidović died in Belgrade in 1940.

Works
 Spomenica: Ljubomira Davidovića, Belgrade, 1940.

References

External links 
Ljuba Davidović gestorben (obituary). In: Die Donau. Wochenblatt für das katholische Deutschtum Jugoslawiens. Nr. 8/1940, 24 February 1940, VI. Jahrgang. Berenc, Apatin 1940, p. 1.
 Biography at Britannica 
 Findagrave: short biography

1863 births
1940 deaths
People from Knjaževac
People from the Principality of Serbia
Democratic Party (Yugoslavia) politicians
Government ministers of Serbia
Government ministers of Yugoslavia
Prime Ministers of Yugoslavia
Representatives in the Yugoslav National Assembly (1921–1941)
Education ministers of Serbia